Gerli Israel (born 7 February 1995) is an Estonian footballer who plays as a defender for the Estonia national team.

International career
Israel made her debut for the Estonia national team on 27 February 2019, as a substitute for Mari-Liis Lillemäe against Malta.

References

1995 births
Living people
Women's association football defenders
Estonian women's footballers
Estonia women's international footballers
Footballers from Tallinn